Polinices flemingianus is a species of predatory sea snail, a marine gastropod mollusk in the family Naticidae, the moon snails.

Description

Distribution
This species is distributed in the Indian Ocean along Aldabra, Chagos and the Mascarene Basin.

References

 Kabat A.R., Finet Y. & Way K. (1997) Catalogue of the Naticidae (Mollusca: Gastropoda) described by C.A. Récluz, including the location of the type specimens. Apex 12(1): 15-26
 Drivas, J. & M. Jay (1988). Coquillages de La Réunion et de l'île Maurice
  Kabat A.R. (2000) Results of the Rumphius Biohistorical Expedition to Ambon (1990). Part 10. Mollusca, Gastropoda, Naticidae. Zoologische Mededelingen 73(25): 345-380

External links

Naticidae
Gastropods described in 1844